Will Blythe is a magazine writer and book author living in New York City.  He is a former literary editor at Esquire magazine but is now a contributing editor for Harper's and Mirabella, and writes for many other periodicals, including The New Yorker, Rolling Stone, Sports Illustrated, Elle, and the Oxford American.

His short story "The Taming Power of the Small" was anthologized in the Best American Short Stories for 1988 and adapted into a 1995 short film starring David Morse and Treat Williams.  Blythe is perhaps best known for his 2006 book, To Hate Like This Is to Be Happy Forever, which follows the author through a season rooting for his beloved University of North Carolina Tar Heels basketball team and examining his hatred of the school's rival, Duke University (see Carolina-Duke rivalry).  The New York Times describes Blythe thus: "... he writes amusingly, self-deprecatingly and often beautifully. {...} Fans of college basketball will wish that all sportswriters possessed Blythe's ability to describe a game, to translate its tension and render its action." Blythe is also the editor of Why I Write: Thoughts on the Craft of Fiction, published in 1999, and co-editor of Lust, Violence, Sin, Magic: Sixty Years of Esquire Fiction, published in 1993. He writes regularly for the New York Times Book Review.

In January 2014, he published an op-ed in The New York Times, "Fired?  Speak No Evil," about being required to sign a "no disparagement" agreement in order to receive severance pay after being fired by Byliner.  "It’s not that I necessarily want to disparage," he concluded, "but I want the freedom to do so, to be able to criticize, to attack, to carp, to excoriate, if need be. I want to tell the truth, even if it isn’t pretty.".

References 

American magazine editors
Living people
American literary editors
Writers from New York City
Year of birth missing (living people)